Old Brick Presbyterian Church is a historic Presbyterian church near Muscle Shoals, Alabama.  The Federal style building was constructed in 1828 and added to the National Register of Historic Places in 1989.

References

External links

Presbyterian churches in Alabama
Churches completed in 1835
Churches on the National Register of Historic Places in Alabama
National Register of Historic Places in Colbert County, Alabama
Historic American Buildings Survey in Alabama
Brick buildings and structures
Federal architecture in Alabama